is a Prefectural Natural Park on the north coast of Aomori Prefecture, Japan, overlooking Mutsu Bay. Established in 1953, the park spans the borders of the municipalities of Aomori and Hiranai.

See also
 National Parks of Japan

References

Parks and gardens in Aomori
Hiranai, Aomori
Protected areas established in 1953
1953 establishments in Japan